James Daniel Piachaud (born 1 March 1937 in Colombo, Ceylon) is a retired Sri Lankan cricketer. Piachaud was a right-handed batsman and a right-arm off break bowler.

Dan Piachaud was educated at St Thomas's, Colombo, and Keble College, Oxford. He made his first-class debut for Oxford University in England in 1958 against Gloucestershire. In a first-class match for Oxford University against Hampshire in 1960, Piachaud was hit for 28 off an over bowled by Butch White: after bowling a dot ball, Piachaud was hit for four sixes and then a four.

After playing fifteen matches for Oxford University up until June of the 1960 season, Piachaud joined Hampshire for the remainder of the 1960 County Championship season. He made his debut for the club against Nottinghamshire in July, and represented the club in twelve first-class matches, the last of which came against Somerset in August. He took 29 wickets at an average of 29.31 with best bowling figures of 4-62. This was his only season with the club.

In 1961 Piachaud represented Oxford University in a further seven first-class matches. In all first-class matches for the University he took 149 wickets at an average of 25.25 with best bowling figures of 8 for 72 against Free Foresters in 1958, when he took 13 for 106 in the match. He played his last match for the University against Cambridge University in 1961.

Piachaud also played three matches of first-class cricket for the Marylebone Cricket Club, making his debut against Cambridge University in 1962 and playing his last first-class match for them against Ireland in 1968. Piachaud also represented his native Ceylon once in first-class cricket in 1968 against the Marylebone Cricket Club. He was selected to tour England with the Ceylon team in 1968, but the tour was cancelled just before it was due to begin.

Piachaud also played first-class cricket for the Gentlemen against the Players in 1961 and for the Free Foresters against Oxford University in 1968. He toured North America with the Marylebone Cricket Club in 1959 and 1967, when no first-class matches were played, and toured the Far East and India with E. W. Swanton's XI in 1963-64, including a first-class match against an Indian XI. He toured Bangladesh with the MCC in 1976-77, the first cricket tour of Bangladesh.

In September 2018, he was one of 49 former Sri Lankan cricketers felicitated by Sri Lanka Cricket, to honour them for their services before Sri Lanka became a full member of the International Cricket Council (ICC).

He married Mary Hutchinson in Harpenden, Hertfordshire, in September 1969. They have three children.

References

External links
Dan Piachaud on Cricinfo
Dan Piachaud on CricketArchive

1937 births
Living people
Alumni of S. Thomas' College, Mount Lavinia
Alumni of Keble College, Oxford
Cricketers from Colombo
Sri Lankan cricketers
Oxford University cricketers
Hampshire cricketers
Marylebone Cricket Club cricketers
Free Foresters cricketers
Gentlemen cricketers
All-Ceylon cricketers